Shaun Reid (born 13 October 1965) is an English former footballer who played as a midfielder. He is the younger brother of Peter Reid and played in a similarly hardworking and tough-tackling manner for Rochdale (in two spells), Preston North End, York City, Bury, Chester City (where he also held coaching roles) and Leigh RMI from 1983 to 2000. He has formerly been in charge at Prescot Cables and Warrington Town

Brotherly Encounters
On-field meetings between Peter and Shaun were confined to pre-season matches, although when Peter was manager of Sunderland they met Shaun's Chester team in the League Cup second round over two legs in September 1998. Shaun had been out through injury for 14 months but returned just in time for the games, which ended in an unsurprising 4–0 aggregate success for Sunderland.

Basement Boy
Unusually, all of Shaun's 432 Football League appearances were made in the fourth tier (Division Four, later renamed Division Three and now known as League Two). He did not make any more appearances for Bury after they were promoted from Division Three in 1995–96. His debut had been a 1–0 win for Rochdale at Crewe Alexandra in January 1984.

Reid's final Football League appearance was as a late substitute for Chester in a 5–0 win over Mansfield Town on 25 March 2000, just six weeks before Chester themselves fell out of the league. He was strongly rumoured to be returning to Rochdale as manager when Graham Barrow was sacked but the job went to Steve Parkin instead. His only subsequent outing at a notable level was again as a substitute for Leigh RMI in a 2–0 Football Conference win over Scarborough in August 2000. He went on to become a football agent.

Coaching and managerial career
Reid holds a UEFA B coaching badge and has had spells coaching at Swindon Town and Plymouth Argyle. In January 2012 he was appointed as manager at Prescot Cables before leaving in March 2012 to become manager at Warrington Town.

In the 2014–15 FA Cup, Reid took Warrington to the first round proper for the first time in their history, where they defeated Exeter City of League Two 1–0., In March 2016 Reid had his contract mutually terminated.

Honours
Bury
Football League Third Division third place: 1995–96

Leigh RMI
Peter Swales Challenge Shield: 1999–2000

References

External links

1965 births
Living people
People from Huyton
English footballers
Association football midfielders
Rochdale A.F.C. players
Preston North End F.C. players
York City F.C. players
Bury F.C. players
Chester City F.C. players
Leigh Genesis F.C. players
English Football League players
National League (English football) players
Chester City F.C. non-playing staff
Swindon Town F.C. non-playing staff
Plymouth Argyle F.C. non-playing staff
English football managers
Prescot Cables F.C. managers
Warrington Town F.C. managers